Singleton is a village and civil parish in Lancashire, England.  It is situated on the coastal plain called the Fylde. It is located south-east of Poulton-le-Fylde, and at the 2001 census had a population of 877, increasing to 889 at the 2011 Census. The parish is sometimes referred to as two parts – Great Singleton is the larger part containing the village, and Little Singleton is a small area north of the village bordering the River Wyre.

History
At the time of the Roman conquest of Britain in the 1st century AD, the area around Singleton was inhabited by a Celtic tribe called the Setantii. The village was recorded in the Domesday Book of 1086 as Singletun.

Singleton railway station once served the village as part of the Preston and Wyre Joint Railway.  The station was situated west of the village, on the road to Blackpool.

Singleton Hall is a Gothic-styled mansion on Lodge Lane, built in 1855 by Thomas Miller (1811-1865), son of a prominent Preston industrialist, also named Thomas Miller. The Hall was later used by Lancashire County Council as a special school and is now converted into private residences. Public pathways outside the Hall have been developed and maintained by the Richard Dumbreck Singleton Trust, endowed by Richard Dumbreck, a great-nephew of Thomas Horrocks Miller.

The Miller family also commissioned Singleton's parish church, St Anne's, designed by Lancaster architect Edward Graham Paley and completed in 1861. It has been designated a Grade II listed building by English Heritage.

Fracking
In 2011, drilling equipment was installed at Grange Hill, east of the village, to test for shale gas in the Bowland Shale Formation around 3 km below the surface. In 2013 Cuadrilla and Centrica made plans for hydraulic fracturing, commonly known as fracking, at the site.

Governance

Singleton is combined with Greenhalgh-with-Thistleton to form the ward of Singleton and Greenhalgh, which elects one councillor.  it is represented by Maxine Chew, an independent councillor.  Singleton also has a parish council.

The village is represented in the House of Commons of the Parliament of the United Kingdom as part of Fylde. It elects one Member of Parliament (MP) by the first past the post system of election. Since the 2010 general election, Fylde has been represented at Parliament by Conservative MP Mark Menzies. The village was part of the North West England constituency of the European Parliament.

See also
Listed buildings in Singleton, Lancashire

References

Footnotes

Sources

External links

 
Villages in Lancashire
Civil parishes in Lancashire
Geography of the Borough of Fylde